Böhlau or Boehlau may refer to:

 Helene Böhlau (1859–1940), a German novelist
 Johannes Boehlau (1861–1941), a German archaeologist
 Böhlau Verlag, a publishing house